This is the list of awards and nominations received by Hong Kong singer G.E.M..

Canadian Chinese Hit Music Chart

CASH Golden Sail Music Awards

China Music Awards

Chinese Media Music Awards

Chinese Music Awards

Commercial Radio Hong Kong Ultimate Song Chart Awards

ERS Top Ten Music Awards

Global Chinese Golden Chart

Global Chinese Pop Chart

Guangzhou Chinese Music Awards

Hong Kong Performing Artistes Guild Awards

Golden Melody Awards

Hito Music Awards

IFPI Hong Kong Sales Awards

Jade Solid Gold Top 10 Awards

KKBox Music Awards

Ku Music Awards

Metro Radio Mandarin Music Awards

Metro Showbiz Hit Awards

Migu Music Awards

Mnet Asian Music Awards

MTV Europe Music Awards

MTV Global Mandarin Music Awards

Hong Kong Music Videos Awards

Nickelodeon Kids' Choice Awards

QQ Music Awards

RTHK Top 10 Gold Songs Awards

Sprite Music Awards

Sina Music Awards

Top 10 Songs and Albums Awards

V–Chart Awards

World Outstanding Youth Chinese Awards

Yahoo! Asia Buzz Awards

Yes! Hong Kong Idol Choice Awards

Mnet Asian Music Awards

Other Achievements

References 

G.E.M.